Founder.org is a nonprofit foundation in San Francisco, California, United States that invests in student entrepreneurs. The organization features a company building program for student entrepreneurs at major research institutes and universities. Operated by a group of Silicon Valley entrepreneurs, Founder.org supports teams across various industries including sensors, sanitation, influencer marketing, biotechnology, health and transportation.

Program
The organization offers a program for student entrepreneurs, recent alumni and faculty from its partner schools. The organization has a mission statement of helping entrepreneurial individuals build successful companies while staying in school.

The 8D Company Building Program aims to improve the odds that more young companies become successful. The program is composed of eight dimensions and challenges that support building a highly effective company. A class of 50 student companies are selected to participate in the 8D Company Building Program. Each team is provided a personalized 12-month engagement with an executive mentor, and has access to a network of industry advisors across a broad range of B2C and B2B sectors. 
Founder.org hosts an annual contest which provides $100,000 in grant funding to ten student companies.
Members of the entering class of 50 teams receive $10K to $100K in seed grant money. Additionally, an investment fund is available to provide $250K - $2.5M in further capital for exceptional teams.

Partner schools

Founder.org partners with a number of colleges and universities which have innovation and entrepreneurship programs. Students who are enrolled in these schools and have founded companies are eligible to participate in the programs. In 2014, there are 24 partner schools in the United States and Europe including Carnegie Mellon University, CDTM – Center for Digital Technology Management, Drexel University, École Polytechnique, École Centrale Paris, EDHEC, ESCP Europe, Harvard Business School, Imperial College London, KTH Royal Institute of Technology, Ludwig-Maximilians-Universität München, Massachusetts Institute of Technology, New York University, Purdue University, Stanford University, Technische Universität Berlin, Technische Universität München, The University of Edinburgh, University College London, University of California at Berkeley, University of California, San Diego, University of California San Francisco, University of Cambridge, University of Pennsylvania and University of Texas at Austin.

History
Founder.org was founded in 2012 by the CEO & Founder of Splunk,  Michael Baum. It opened applications for the Class of 2014 in January 2013, and accepted its first ten companies in June 2013. The second Class of 2015 was increased in size to 50 companies and was accepted in June 2014.

Investments
Alongside seed grants, Founder.org invests additional capital into some of the startups in the program. As of September, 2014, the program had made 8 follow on investments. For example, the company participated in the round of energy intelligence startup, Verdigris Technologies. In some cases, the program will act as the lead investor in a round. Founder.org led the seed round of a Stanford-based influencer marketing startup, NeoReach  and medical stethoscope, Eko.

See also
 Y Combinator (company)
 Business incubator

References

External links
 

Business incubators of the United States
Companies based in Mountain View, California